British Columbia is the third-most populous province in Canada, with 5,000,879 residents as of 2021, and is the second-largest in land area, at . A municipality is a local government incorporated by the province allowing a community to govern itself and to provide and regulate local services. These services typically include, but are not limited to, the provision of drinking water, sewers, roads, fire protection, street lights, garbage/recycling collection, land use planning, building inspection, and parks.

Within their limited jurisdictions, municipalities are autonomous, responsible and accountable to their citizens and to the province. Their powers and responsibilities are regulated through the Local Government Act, the Community Charter, and, in the case of Vancouver, the Vancouver Charter. They have the power of a natural person, the power to expropriate, and the power to establish and enforce bylaws. They are able to raise funds through property taxes and user fees, and borrow a limited amount through the Municipal Finance Authority of British Columbia to pay for capital costs.

Municipalities are governed by a mayor and council who are democratically elected every 4 years on the third Saturday in October. The most recent election took place on October 20, 2018; the next election will take place on October 15, 2022. Each municipality is a member of a regional district to which their councils elect representatives. The board of directors of the regional district is used as a forum to discuss regional issues.

To become a municipality, a community, with the assistance of the provincial Ministry of Community, Sport and Cultural Development, defines its borders and holds a referendum on the issue. If successful the Cabinet of British Columbia issues a letters patent incorporating the community. Part 2 of the Local Government Act sets out a classification scheme that gives each new municipality a designation. If the population is fewer than 2,500 people the new municipality is designated a village, if between 2,500 and 5,000 a town, and if greater than 5,000 a city. The municipality must request change in designation but is not compelled to do so, despite population growth or loss – Greenwood has retained its city status, for example, rather than relinquishing it as other boomtowns of its era have done. There is no longer any legal difference between the designations.

Cities 

A city is a classification of municipalities used in British Columbia. British Columbia's lieutenant governor may incorporate a community as a city by letters patent, on the recommendation of the Minister of Communities, Sport and Cultural Development, if its population is greater than 5,000 and the outcome of a vote involving affected residents was that greater than 50 percent voted in favour of the proposed incorporation.

British Columbia has 52 cities, had a cumulative population of 3,630,140 in the 2021 census. British Columbia's largest and smallest cities are Vancouver and Greenwood with populations of 662,248 and 702 respectively. The fastest-growing city in British Columbia is Langford, which grew 31.8 percent between 2016 and 2021, while the fastest-shrinking is Merritt, which shrunk by 1.2 percent. The first community to incorporate as a city was New Westminster on July 16, 1860, while the most recent community to incorporate as a city was Mission on March 29, 2021.

District municipalities 

A district municipality is a classification of municipalities used in British Columbia.

British Columbia has 49 district municipalities that had a cumulative population of 669,454 in the 2021 Census. British Columbia's largest and smallest district municipalities are Langley and Wells with populations of 132,603 and 218 respectively. The fastest-growing district municipality in British Columbia is Stewart, which grew 28.9 percent between 2016 and 2021, while the fastest-shrinking is the Northern Rockies Regional Municipality, which declined by 18.8 percent.

Of British Columbia's current 49 district municipalities, the first to incorporate as a district municipality was North Cowichan on June 18, 1873, while the most recent community to incorporate as a district municipality was the Northern Rockies Regional Municipality (NRRM) on February 6, 2009. Although portrayed as a regional municipality in its official name, the NRRM is actually classified as a district municipality.

Indian government districts  
The lone Indian government district was granted by the federal Sechelt Indian Band Self-Government Act and provincial Sechelt Indian Government District Enabling Act to the Sechelt Indian Government District which governs the Sechelt Indian Band lands consisting of 33 former Indian reserves.

Island municipalities 
If the community wishing to incorporate is located within a trust area under the Island Trust Act, it must incorporate as an island municipality. A single island municipality designation has been granted to Bowen Island.

Mountain resort municipalities 
A mountain resort municipality designation is granted by the Minister of Community, Sport and Cultural Development through the Local Government Act if there exists alpine ski lift operations, year-round recreational facilities, and commercial overnight accommodations. British Columbia's lone mountain resort municipality is Sun Peaks.

Resort municipalities 
A single resort municipality designation has been granted to Whistler by the Resort Municipality of Whistler Act.

Towns 

A town is a classification of municipalities used in British Columbia. British Columbia's lieutenant governor may incorporate a community as a town by letters patent, under the recommendation of the Minister of Communities, Sport and Cultural Development, if its population is greater than 2,500 but not greater than 5,000 and the outcome of a vote involving affected residents was that greater than 50 percent voted in favour of the proposed incorporation.

British Columbia has 14 towns that had a cumulative population of 95,922 in the 2021 census. British Columbia's largest and smallest towns are Comox and Port McNeill with populations of 14,806 and 2,356 respectively. View Royal and Smithers are the fastest-growing and fastest-shrinking towns in the province, growing by 11.2 percent and shrinking by 0.4 percent respectively between 2016 and 2021. Of British Columbia's current 14 towns, the first to incorporate as a town was Ladysmith on June 3, 1904, while the most recent community to incorporate as a town was View Royal on December 5, 1988.

Villages 

A village is a classification of municipalities used in British Columbia. British Columbia's lieutenant governor may incorporate a community as a village by letters patent, on the recommendation of the Minister of Communities, Sport and Cultural Development, if its population is not greater than 2,500 and the outcome of a vote involving affected residents was that greater than 50 percent voted in favour of the proposed incorporation.

British Columbia has 42 villages that had a cumulative population of 48,511 in the 2021 census. British Columbia's largest and smallest villages are Cumberland and Zeballos with populations of 4,447 and 126 respectively. Radium Hot Springs and Silverton are the fastest-growing and fastest-shrinking villages in the province, growing by 72.6 percent and shrinking by 23.6 percent respectively between 2016 and 2021. Of British Columbia's current 42 villages, the first to incorporate as a village was Kaslo on August 14, 1893, while the most recent community to incorporate as a village was Queen Charlotte on December 5, 2005.

List of municipalities

Former municipalities 
Communities in British Columbia that once held their own municipal status include Aennofield, Alberni, Brocklehurst, Chapman Camp, Columbia, Cranberry Lake, Dewdney, Dufferin, Fort Nelson, Fraser Mills, Glenmore, Guisachan, Kinnaird, Marysville, Matsqui, Mission City, Natal, Nicomen Island, North Kamloops, Phoenix, Point Grey, Sandon, South Fort George, South Vancouver, Sumas, Tadanac, Valleyview and Westview. The majority of these former municipalities ceased to exist as a result of amalgamation with or annexation by another municipality. Others, such as Phoenix and Sandon, were dissolved from their municipal status as a result of population decline, while Dewdney dissolved due to financial reasons. The Jumbo Glacier Mountain Resort Municipality was dissolved in 2021.

See also 

List of designated places in British Columbia
List of Haida villages
List of population centres in British Columbia

Notes

References

External links 
Local Government Department History
Managing Changes to Local Government Structure in British Columbia: A Review and Program Guide
Ministry of Community, Sport and Cultural Development

Municipalities B